Carl Ludwig Hübsch (born 1966 in Freiburg im Breisgau) is a German jazz musician, tuba player, and composer.

Discography
Album: Longrun Development Of The Universe: The Creators Bend A Master Plan. The Carl Ludwig Hübsch brass trio; Hübsch (tuba); Matthias Schubert (tenor saxophone); Wolter Wierbos (trombone) with guest Gerry Hemingway (drums). NEOS Records 41003CD
Lumière; 
Not Even; 
Three Pinups; 
Orbiting and Module Modulations.

References

1966 births
Living people
German jazz musicians